Spelunker may refer to:

 Spelunkers, people who participate in exploration of cave systems
 Spelunker (video game), a 1983 video game
 Spelunker HD, a 2009 video game
 An Info-Mac search utility

See also
 Spelunky
 Dive (film)
 
 Caver (disambiguation)